William Thomas Shave Daniel (1806–1891) was vice-chairman of the Incorporated Council of Law Reporting.

Life
He was the eldest son of William Daniel, of Stapenhill, then part of Derbyshire. W T S Daniel was born on 17 March 1806. On 12 September 1831, he married Harriet, eldest daughter of John Mayou, Esq., of Coleshill. She died in 1838. On 11 April 1840, he married Sarah, only daughter of Arthur William Trollope, headmaster of Christ's Hospital.

Career
W T S Daniel became a student of Lincoln's Inn on 27 January 1825, was called to the bar on 8 February 1830, became Queen's Counsel on 17 July 1851, and was called to the bench on 3 November 1851. He was recorder of Ipswich from 1842 to 1848. He was a county court judge, on circuit No. 11, from March 1867 to 12 April 1884. He was joint judge at Leeds for the trial of equity and bankruptcy cases in 1875. He was vice-chairman (and originator) of the system of the law reports of the Council of Law Reporting from 1865 to 1870, and a member of the Law Digest Commission in 1868. He contested Tamworth in 1859 and 1865.

Works
He is the author of The History and Origin of the Law Reports (1884).

References

1806 births
1891 deaths
County Court judges (England and Wales)
Members of Lincoln's Inn
English King's Counsel